James Pye (1801 – 30 December 1884) was an Australian orchardist and politician. He was a member of the New South Wales Legislative Assembly for one term between 1856 and 1858.

Early life
Pye was the son of a pioneer Australian orchardist. After an elementary education he joined his father's business and eventually had large orchards in the Field of Mars and Seven Hills district. He founded the Cumberland Agricultural Society in 1857 and was active in the Royal Agricultural Society of New South Wales. Pye was the patron of numerous organisations in the Parramatta region including the National School Board. He was an alderman on Parramatta Municipality between 1861 and 1884 and Mayor in 1866–7.

In the 1850s, Pye offered the land surrounding Hunts Creek at nominal cost to the Government to enable the construction of dam and reservoir, known as Lake Parramatta, that operated as a permanent water supply to the City of Parramatta between 1856 and 1909.

Colonial Parliament
In 1856, Pye was elected as one of the two members for Cumberland (North Riding) in the first New South Wales Legislative Assembly under responsible government. In parliament he was noted for his attacks on the luxurious living of the working class, noting that "not one in twenty was worth employing and the native born were particularly idle". At the 1858 election, he was a candidate for Parramatta where he was comprehensively beaten.

References

 

1801 births
1884 deaths
Members of the New South Wales Legislative Assembly
Australian orchardists
19th-century Australian politicians
Mayors and Lord Mayors of Parramatta
19th-century Australian businesspeople